Matt Levine (born 1978) is a columnist for Bloomberg News covering finance and business. Levine has previously been a lawyer, investment banker, law clerk, and has written for a number of newspapers and financial sites. His newsletter, Money Stuff, is one of the most popular on Wall Street with over 150,000 subscribers as of October 2020.

Education 
Levine graduated Harvard University, where he majored in classics, and Yale Law School.

Career 
After graduating Harvard, Levine was a high school Latin teacher. He left that profession for law school and became a mergers and acquisitions lawyer for the law firm Wachtell, Lipton, Rosen & Katz. He later went on to become an investment banker for Goldman Sachs, where he structured and marketed corporate equity derivatives for four years. Levine was also a law clerk for the U.S. Court of Appeals for the 3rd Circuit.

In 2011, Levine started writing about economics and finance for the financial news site Dealbreaker. There, he wrote about the "deals, scandals, complexities and personalities of the financial services industry." Levine's coverage and analysis of the 2012 JPMorgan Chase trading loss was featured in the Columbia Journalism Review's anthology "The Best Business Writing 2013."

In 2013, Levine joined Bloomberg View (now Bloomberg Opinion) as an opinion columnist covering finance and business. He writes the newsletter Money Stuff for Bloomberg, which is published every weekday. Levine's analysis in his column have been widely covered by other newspapers. The newsletter has close to 150k subscribers making it one of the most popular newsletters on Wall Street.

Levine has also written for The Wall Street Journal, CNN, The Billfold, and the Planet Money blog.

When asked about the possibility of switching to a paid version similar to Ben Thompson's Stratechery Levine said that he enjoys the heightened fame of writing a free newsletter as it reaches more people than a paid newsletter.

Levine took several months off in 2020 for parental leave after the birth of his second child.

A statistical examination that Levine cited in Money Stuff showed that his newsletter has been released 4 minutes later each month since 2015 and has gotten progressively longer over time.

Writing style 
Levine is known for his humorous, witty, deadpan writing style.

Praise 
Levine has received praise from the likes of Bill Ackman and Jim Chanos, with Ackman saying "His work is some of the most sophisticated analysis of what is really happening on Wall Street".

References

Further reading

External links 
 
 
 Matt Levine's articles at Bloomberg
 Matt Levine's articles at Dealbreaker

Living people
Bloomberg L.P. people
American columnists
Goldman Sachs people
American lawyers
American investment bankers
Harvard University alumni
Yale Law School alumni
Wachtell, Lipton, Rosen & Katz people
1978 births